Christiane Jolissaint and Dianne van Rensburg were the defending champions but only van Rensburg competed that year with Belinda Cordwell.

Cordwell and van Rensburg lost in the quarterfinals to Sandra Cecchini and Laura Gildemeister.

Katrina Adams and Lori McNeil won in the final 2–6, 6–3, 6–4 against Larisa Savchenko and Natasha Zvereva.

Seeds
Champion seeds are indicated in bold text while text in italics indicates the round in which those seeds were eliminated.

 Larisa Savchenko /  Natasha Zvereva (final)
 Katrina Adams /  Lori McNeil (champions)
 Elise Burgin /  Betsy Nagelsen (semifinals)
 Belinda Cordwell /  Dianne van Rensburg (quarterfinals)

Draw

External links
 1989 European Open Doubles Draw

WTA Swiss Open
European Open - Doubles